Gods of the Blood: The Pagan Revival and White Separatism  is a book by  Swedish scholar Mattias Gardell discussing neopaganism (in particular Germanic) and white separatism, neo-fascism, and antisemitism.

It was published by Duke University Press in June 2003.

Reception
Amos Yong grouped the book with recent scholarship by Michael Barkun and Jeffrey Kaplan. With its more narrow focus on the pagan white separatist landscape, Yong described it as "a well-written report and analysis of this phenomenon". Stefanie von Schnurbein wrote that the combination of racialist ideology and neopaganism had been "sadly understudied" by scholars, and that "Gods of the Blood is an important and innovative contribution to filling this void". Publishers Weekly wrote that "although Gardell's academic tone and sometimes torturous prose make for slow reading, his well-researched book offers never-before-seen glimpses of the visions and goals of racist pagans".

Book information
Hardcover and Paperback: 456 pages
Publisher: Duke University Press (June 2003)
Language: English
Hardcover: , 
Paperback: ,

See also
National Socialist black metal

References

2003 non-fiction books
Antisemitism in the United States
Books about Germanic neopaganism
Neo-fascism
Modern paganism in the United States
White separatism
2000s in modern paganism